Astia is an investing non-profit founded as the Women's Technology Center in 1999. Astia is an organization built on a community of experts whose goal is to ensure the success of women in high-growth start-ups.

Headquartered in San Francisco, California, U.S., the WTC was founded as part of the Three Guineas Fund in 1999, by Cate Muther, former CMO of Cisco Systems, and was spun off in 2003 as an independent non-profit.

See also 
 Business incubator
 Venture capital
 Angel investor

References

External links
 

Business incubators of the United States
Organizations established in 1999
Non-profit organizations based in the San Francisco Bay Area
Organizations for women in business
Women's occupational organizations
Science and technology in the San Francisco Bay Area
1999 establishments in California